Jason O'Toole may refer to:

Jason O'Toole (musician), vocalist for New York hardcore band Life's Blood
Jason O'Toole (journalist) (born 1973), Irish author and journalist